The Men's 50 kilometre classical competition at the FIS Nordic World Ski Championships 2023 was held on 5 March 2023.

Results
The race was started at 12:00.

References

Men's 50 kilometre classical